The Nitty Gritty Dirt Band is the first album by the Nitty Gritty Dirt Band, released in 1967. This album debuted on the U.S. Billboard Top Pop Albums chart on April 8, 1967, peaked at number 161, and was on the charts for eight weeks. The single "Buy for Me the Rain" b/w "Candy Man" debuted on the U.S. Billboard Hot 100 on April 8, 1967, peaked at number 45 on May 6, 1967, and was on the charts for seven weeks. In Canada, the single reached number 37 in May 1967.

Track listing
"Buy for Me the Rain" (Steve Noonan, Greg Copeland) – 2:23
"Euphoria" (Charlie Ventura, Roy Kral) – 1:27
"Melissa" (Jackson Browne) – 2:17
"You Took the Happiness (Out of My Head)" (Russ Regan) – 2:25
"Hard Hearted Hannah (The Vamp of Savannah)" (Jack Yellen, Milton Ager, Robert Wilcox Bigelow, Charles Bates) – 2:10
"Holding" (Jackson Browne) – 2:38
"Song to Jutta" (Bruce Kunkel) – 2:35
"Candy Man" (Rev. Gary Davis) – 2:29
"Dismal Swamp" (John McEuen, William E. McEuen) – 1:55
"I Wish I Could Shimmy Like My Sister Kate" (Armand J. Piron) – 1:50
"Crazy Words, Crazy Tune" (Jack Yellen, Milton Ager) – 1:27
"You're Gonna Get It in the End" (Michael Takamatsu, Jim Hendricks, Fred Olson) – 2:28

Personnel
The Nitty Gritty Dirt Band
Bruce "Spider Bones" Kunkel – guitar, kazoo, washtub bass
Jeff "Spunky Duff" Hanna – washboard, sandblocks, guitar, comb, kazoo, Phinius
Jimmy "Starch Harpo" Fadden – harmonica, washtub bass, Phinius, kazoo, cigarette
"Raucous" Ralph Barr – guitar, kazoo, washtub bass, bubbles
Les "Totally" Thompson – mandolin, kazoo, washtub bass, Phinius
John "King O' Banjo" McEuen – banjo, washtub bass
James SK Wān – slide whistle
Technical
Armin Steiner - engineer
John Stewart, William E. McEuen - photography

Production
Producer – Dallas Smith

About the songs
The album liner notes were written by Tiger Beat magazine feature editor Ann Moses. It focuses mostly on what the members look like, nicknames, and personalities – the type of information readers of Tiger Beat, teenage girls, would have been interested in.

The songs fall mostly into two very different styles. Half sound like songs of the 1920s; the other half sound like late 1960s laid-back rock. "Dismal Swamp" is bluegrass.

"Buy for Me the Rain" is one of the 1960s-style songs. It starts with guitar playing a fast, staccato pattern. This is joined by a violin playing long notes over top. Jeff Hanna sings lead. Someone else sings harmony on the second half of the verse, and a lower voice echos the last line of each verse [Bruce Kunkel]. That last line is always a cautionary variation on "before it is too late". The first two verses propose buying things of natural beauty for each other, that cannot truly be bought, like the rain. The third verse says that happiness cannot be bought, and the final verse says that what we buy for each other is for "the living, it's no use to the dead."  "Buy for Me the Rain" has been used as the main theme for the long running agriculture and agribusiness magazine TV program Market To Market, produced by Iowa PBS, and still used to this very day.

"Euphoria" was written by Robin Remailly, and was recorded first by the Holy Modal Rounders on their debut album in 1964 and later by the Youngbloods on their album Earth Music in 1968.  (The songwriting credits on the Nitty Gritty Dirt Band album erroneously name saxophonist and band leader Charlie Ventura and his piano player Roy Kral; their 1949 "Euphoria" is a different item altogether.) It is a fast song featuring much wacky laughter. The vocals sound like Jimmie Fadden, and he also plays harmonica on this. Someone else doubles the vocals in parts in a silly falsetto. Banjo and guitar provide the music.

"Melissa" was written by Jackson Browne years before his first record. The song is in the 1920s style. The tempo is lazy and the music features banjo, guitar, and snare drum. Kazoo present the melody, with a clickity clack percussion, at the beginning of the song and repeats at the break.

"You Took the Happiness Out of My Head" is also performed in the 1920s style. The tempo is a little faster and banjo, guitar, and snare drum provide the foundation of the music. A harmonica is played over top of this and featured at the break. The lyrics are essentially "you broke my heart when you went away". The song ends with more wacky laughter.

"Hard Hearted Hannah" was a popular song from the 1920s. It is performed here in that style, as a mid-tempo song featuring piano more prominently. The vocals feature call and response. The lyrics describe how a woman named Hannah likes to see men suffer.

"Holding" is the second Jackson Browne composition. It is an up-tempo tune in the 1960s style, featuring guitar in the foreground and banjo in the background. Holding means something slightly different in each verse and chorus; the narrator is holding his door open, holding his own, and holding his name up.

"Song to Jutta" is a 1960s-style song written by band member Bruce Kunkel. Guitar, snare, and tambourine provide the back rhythm. A piano provides the baseline and an electric piano plays a counter melody. Vocals are long notes giving it a mellow feel. The lyrics implore you to take in the beauty of morning walk on the beach before you have to face the harsh world.

"Candy Man" was written by Reverend Gary Davis, a blues and gospel singer and guitarist.  Jeff Hanna sings lead on this up tempo version. Another voice replies on the last verse. It features two harmonicas on the breaks.

"Dismal Swamp" is a fast bluegrass instrumental. John McEuen's banjo dominates the song. It also features violin. The song was written by John and his brother William, who was their manager and produced some of their other albums.

"I Wish I Could Shimmy Like My Sister Kate" is an up-tempo jazz dance song, written in 1919 and is performed here in that style. Kazoo, banjo, and guitar are featured on the break. There is a double vocal on the chorus.

"Crazy Words – Crazy Tune" was composed in 1927, a quick, snappy number which the title describes perfectly.  It is also known as "Washington at Valley Forge". The lyrics are about someone who is annoyed at their neighbor, for playing the ukulele and singing all night long. The music provided by guitar, banjo, and snare. The kazoo solo performed by band member Bruce "Spider Bones" Kunkel.

"You're Gonna Get It in the End" was written by the band The Lamp of Childhood. While The Lamp only released a few singles, and had no hits, one member had some notoriety. James Hendricks had been in The Big Three and The Mugwumps with his then wife Cass Elliot. He went on to write the number-one hit "Summer Rain" for Johnny Rivers. "You're Gonna Get It In The End" was a Lamp Of Childhood unreleased track and was included on this album months after The Lamp Of Childhood broke up. This is performed in the 1960s style. It features banjo and guitar throughout and a guitar solo at the break. The lyrics are about getting revenge on a girl who is messing with his mind.

References
All information from album liner notes unless otherwise noted.

Nitty Gritty Dirt Band albums
1967 debut albums
Liberty Records albums